A Prize Package is a 1912 American silent black and white comedy film produced by Siegmund Lubin.

It's a lost film on one reel. The films was produced by the Philadelphia-based Lubin Manufacturing Company and was lost in an explosion and fire at the Lubin vaults in 1914.

Cast
 Jerold T. Hevener as Spoony Pete
 Eleanor Caines as Fannie Fatima
 Marie Rainford as Miss Wiggins
 Jack Barrymore as Si Hawkins
 William Raus as The Old Maid

See also
John Barrymore filmography

References

External links
 

American silent short films
American black-and-white films
Silent American comedy films
1912 comedy films
1912 films
Lubin Manufacturing Company films
General Film Company
1910s American films